The SIAI S.58 or Savoia-Marchetti S.M.58 was an Italian flying boat fighter prototype of the 1920s designed and manufactured by SIAI.

Design and development

S.58
In 1924, the Regia Marina (Italian Royal Navy) issued a requirement for a replacement for its Macchi M.7ter flying boat fighter. To compete with the Macchi M.26 for a production order as the replacement, SIAI developed the S.58. It was a wooden, single-seat, single-bay biplane with a hull based on that of the SIAI S.51 racing flying boat which had participated in the 1922 Schneider Trophy race. The S.58s engine, a 221-kilowatt (296-brake horsepower) Hispano-Suiza HS 42 V8 driving a pusher propeller, was mounted on struts above the hull. SIAI proposed an armament of two fixed, forward-firing 7.7-millimeter (0.303-inch) Vickers machine guns mounted on the hull on either side of the cockpit.

The S.58 made its first flight early in the summer of 1924 and on 25 August 1924 set a world altitude record for aircraft of its type by reaching 5,831 meters (19,130 feet) with a payload of 250 kilograms (551 pounds). SIAI built three prototypes, but the Regia Marina opted to save money by re-engining the Macchi M.7ter to extend its service life rather than purchase a new aircraft. SIAI did, however, build at least one more S.58, which the Scuola di Alta Velocità (High Speed School) at Desenzano used.

S.58bis

SIAI later fitted the first S.58 prototype with a 313-kilowatt (420-horsepower) Fiat A.20 V12, redesignating the re-engined aircraft the S.58bis. In 1927, the Regia Marina again held a contest for a replacement for the Macchi M.7ter, and SIAI entered the S.58bis. The Regia Marina found it impressive enough to make plans to procure 97 S.58bis aircraft, but these plans were cancelled when the Regia Marina again chose as an economy measure to extend the M.7ters service life by re-engining it, and no production order materialized for the S.58bis.

S.58ter
In the autumn of 1928, the S.58ter, a slightly modified S.58bis also employing the Fiat A 20 V12 engine, flew for the first time. In 1929, the Regia Marina again organized a contest for an M.7ter replacement, and SIAI entered the S.58ter. The S.58ter lost out to the Macchi M.41bis and did not win a production order.

Operators

Regia Aeronautica
Regia Marina

Specifications (S.58bis)

Notes:
Time to 3,000 m (9,842 ft): 7.66 min

See also

Notes

References

Green, William, and Gordon Swanborough. The Complete Book of Fighters: An Illustrated Encyclopedia of Every Fighter Aircraft Built and Flown. New York: SMITHMARK Publishers, 1994. .

S.58
1920s Italian fighter aircraft
Single-engined tractor aircraft
Biplanes
Aircraft first flown in 1924